Makkal TV is a Tamil language TV channel. It was launched on 6 September 2006 and is promoted by Makkal Tholai Thodarpu Kuzhumam. Pattali Makkal Katchi leader Ramadoss is the founder of TV and T.Bhuvaneswari is the Vice President and Administrator of the Channel.

Programs 

 Chinna Chinna Aasai
 Theethum Nandrum
 7 Naal 7 Suvai
 Akkarai Seemai Aalayangal
 Kuttram
 Jannalukku Veliye
 Azhagiya Tamizh Magan/Magal 
 Aadal Arasigalin Sangamam
 Kaalai Vanakkam
 Andam 
 Rettai Vaal Kuruvi (Live Game Show)
 Achamillai
 Nam Nattu Samayail 
 Malarum Bhoomi 
 Uppum Orappum 
 Pennay Unagaka
 Pattimandram
 Elakkiya pithan Pattimandram telecast in makkal TV in special function days

Dubbed Soap Operas
 Sayeera
 Neethane En Ponvasantham
 Neelambari

References

External links 
 Official website

Tamil-language television channels
Television stations in Chennai
Television channels and stations established in 2006
2006 establishments in Tamil Nadu